The Israelite Association of Venezuela, (Spanish: Asociación Israelita de Venezuela), known as Tiferet Israel, founded in the 1920s by Sephardic Jews, is the oldest surviving Jewish organization in Venezuela.  An association of Sephardic Jews, it supports a large synagogue in Caracas and counts about 800 families among its members.

2009 attack

In late January 2009, the synagogue was badly damaged in a well-organized attack, following an article inciting anti-Semitic violence, which appeared (later removed, and replaced by an apology) on a government website, after the 2008–2009 Israel–Gaza conflict.
 An armed gang consisting of 15 unidentified men 
broke into the synagogue, tied and gagged security guards and occupied the building for several hours. Anti-Semitic and anti-Israeli graffiti was daubed on the walls  and the synagogue office and Holy Ark were ransacked. They also called for Jews to be expelled from the country. Venezuela's Foreign Minister Nicolas Maduro condemned the act as a "criminal act of vandalism". The Information Minister Jesse Chacón also condemned the attack and denied it had any connection with the government.

See also

 History of the Jews in Venezuela

References

Synagogues in Venezuela
Jews and Judaism in Venezuela
21st-century attacks on synagogues and Jewish communal organizations
Jewish organizations
Jewish organizations established in the 1920s
Buildings and structures in Caracas
Sephardi Jewish culture in Venezuela
Sephardi synagogues